MAHS may refer to:
 Meath Archaeological and Historical Society in County Meath, Ireland

Schools 
 Brimm Medical Arts High School, Camden, New Jersey, United States
 Manual Arts High School, Los Angeles, California, United States
 Maywood Academy High School, Maywood, California, United States
 Menlo-Atherton High School, Atherton, California, United States
 Moon Area High School, Moon Township, Pennsylvania, United States
 Mount Alvernia High School, Newton, Massachusetts, United States
 Mount Alvernia High School (Pittsburgh), Pittsburgh, Pennsylvania, United States
 Munich American High School, a closed United States Department of Defense Dependents Schools system school in Munich, Germany